Fu Chunyan (born December 28, 1989, in Qiqihar, Heilongjiang) is a Chinese female speed skater.

She competed for China at the 2010 Winter Olympics in the 3000 m event.

References

External links 
 
 
 
 

1989 births
Living people
Chinese female speed skaters
Olympic speed skaters of China
Speed skaters at the 2010 Winter Olympics
Asian Games medalists in speed skating
Asian Games silver medalists for China
Speed skaters at the 2011 Asian Winter Games
Medalists at the 2011 Asian Winter Games
Universiade medalists in speed skating
Universiade gold medalists for China
Competitors at the 2009 Winter Universiade
Sportspeople from Qiqihar
20th-century Chinese women
21st-century Chinese women